The third season of Fargo, an American anthology dark comedy–crime drama television series created by Noah Hawley, premiered on April 19, 2017, on the basic cable network FX. The season had ten episodes, and its initial airing concluded on June 21, 2017. As an anthology, each Fargo season possesses its own self-contained narrative, following a set of characters in various settings in a connected shared universe.

The third season is set primarily between 2010 and 2011, in three Minnesota towns: St. Cloud, Eden Valley, and Eden Prairie, and is the first season not to feature the titular Fargo, North Dakota. It follows the lives of a couple, Ray Stussy (Ewan McGregor) and Nikki Swango (Mary Elizabeth Winstead), who, after unsuccessfully trying to rob Ray's wealthy older brother Emmit (also played by McGregor), become involved in a double murder case. One of the victims is an old man with a mysterious past whose stepdaughter, Gloria Burgle (Carrie Coon), is a policewoman. Meanwhile, Emmit tries to cut his ties with a shady organization he borrowed money from a year before, but the company, represented by V. M. Varga (David Thewlis) has other plans. 

Michael Stuhlbarg, Hamish Linklater, Olivia Sandoval, Shea Whigham, Mark Forward, Mary McDonnell, and Scoot McNairy make recurring appearances. Sylvester Groth, Ray Wise, Fred Melamed, Francesca Eastwood, Frances Fisher, DJ Qualls, and Rob McElhenney guest star.

Season 3 began filming in early 2017 in Calgary, Alberta.

Cast

Main
 Ewan McGregor as brothers Emmit and Raymond "Ray" Stussy. Emmit is a wealthy, happily married man and the self-proclaimed "Parking Lot King of Minnesota." Younger brother Ray is a financially struggling parole officer who feels betrayed by Emmit over the way their father's inheritance was divided between them, when Ray got his father's Corvette and Emmit got a valuable stamp collection. McGregor also voiced the Captain, the android MNSKY's scientist companion.
 Carrie Coon as Gloria Burgle, a dedicated police officer and police chief of Eden Valley until the department is absorbed by the county. She is trying to solve her stepfather's murder.
 Mary Elizabeth Winstead as Nikki Swango, a crafty and alluring young woman with a passion for competitive bridge. She is a recent parolee and Ray's fiancée.
 Goran Bogdan as Yuri Gurka, a Ukrainian man working for V. M. Varga.
 David Thewlis as V. M. Varga, an unscrupulous British businessman with whom Emmit unwillingly finds himself in a partnership.

Recurring

Guest stars

Billy Bob Thornton, who appeared as Lorne Malvo in season one, narrates Peter and the Wolf in the fourth episode, "The Narrow Escape Problem".

Episodes

Production

Casting
Ewan McGregor was cast in the lead dual role as Emmit and Ray Stussy, and Carrie Coon plays the lead female role, Gloria Burgle. In September 2016, Mary Elizabeth Winstead was cast in a major role as Nikki Swango and Scoot McNairy in a recurring role. In November 2016, it was announced that Jim Gaffigan had joined the main cast in the role of Donny Mashman, Gloria Burgle's partner. However, it was later announced that Gaffigan would not appear in the season due to scheduling conflicts. Mark Forward was later cast to replace him as Mashman, and Mashman's role in the story was reduced. In December 2016, several new actors joined the cast, including David Thewlis, Michael Stuhlbarg, Shea Whigham, Fred Melamed and Thomas Mann.

Filming
Filming began in early 2017 in Calgary, Alberta, where the previous two seasons were also filmed.

Regarding filming with Ewan McGregor while he is portraying dual roles, co-star Mary Elizabeth Winstead said, "For some takes, I was standing with Ewan's double and for some takes, I was standing with Ewan." She added, "Watching how the doubles interact with him and have to learn his way of walking and his posture and his way of standing was interesting. They make it feel very natural and grounded and real. They're reading the lines and the scenes are existing as they would regularly, just swapping out the people. Which is somewhat strange, but it still doesn't feel like you're doing a trick of any sort."

Visual style
As with the previous two seasons, the third season had its own distinct visual style, achieved through color grading by removing the blue channel. Noah Hawley described the technique, saying "So you take the blue channel on the digital image and you just dial it out. And what you end up with is a very distinctive look in which colors like red and orange and yellow; they just really pop in a different way. Usually in cold weather you add blue, because blue denotes cold. So it was interesting to take the blue out and see what it did to the image. And once we did that it became clear that it doesn’t look at all like any of the other years, which I really liked."

Reception

Reviews
The third season has received acclaim from critics. On Metacritic, it has a score of 89 out of 100 based on 32 reviews, indicating "universal acclaim." On Rotten Tomatoes, it has a 93% "certified fresh" rating with an average score of 8.56 out of 10 based on 50 reviews. The site's critical consensus reads: "Thanks in part to a memorable dual performance from Ewan McGregor, Fargo mostly maintains the sly wit and off-kilter sensibility it displayed in its first two seasons."

Accolades

In addition to the six Emmy nominations listed below, the series earned an additional ten nominations in various technical and creative categories.

References

External links
 
 

Television series set in 2010
Television series set in 2011
2017 American television seasons
Fratricide in fiction